Marguerite-Bourgeoys is a provincial electoral district in the Montreal region of Quebec, Canada that elects members to the National Assembly of Quebec. It comprises the LaSalle borough of the city of Montreal.

It was created for the 1966 election from parts of Jacques-Cartier and Montréal–Notre-Dame-de-Grâce electoral districts.

In the change from the 2001 to the 2011 electoral map, it gained some territory from Marquette electoral district.

It was named after Saint Marguerite Bourgeoys.

Members of the Legislative Assembly / National Assembly

Election results

^ Change is from redistributed results. CAQ change is from ADQ. 

^ PDS change is from NPD.

|NDP - RMS Coalition
|Thomas Rufh
| style="text-align:right;" |312
| style="text-align:right;" |0.78
| style="text-align:right;" |–

References

External links
Information
 Elections Quebec

Election results
 Election results (National Assembly)

Maps
 2011 map (PDF)
 2001 map (Flash)
2001–2011 changes (Flash)
1992–2001 changes (Flash)
 Electoral map of Montreal region
 Quebec electoral map, 2011

Provincial electoral districts of Montreal
Marguerite-Bourgeoys
LaSalle, Quebec